Atiwa District is a former district that was located in Eastern Region, Ghana. Originally it was formerly part of the then-larger East Akim District in 1988, which was created from the former East Akim District Council, until the northwest part of the district was split off to create Atiwa District on 17 February 2004; thus the remaining part has been retained as East Akim District, which it was elevated to municipal district assembly status on 29 February 2008 to become East Akim Municipal District. However on 1 June 2018, it was split off into two new districts: Atiwa West District (capital: Kwabeng) and Atiwa East District (capital: Anyinam). The municipality was located in the central part of Eastern Region and had Kwabeng as its capital town.

List of settlements

Sources 
 
 Districts: Atiwa District

References 

Districts of the Eastern Region (Ghana)

States and territories established in 2004

2004 establishments in Ghana